Exeter Bridge is a bridge in the centre of Derby spanning the River Derwent 200 metres south of the more modern Cathedral Green Footbridge.

History
Derby's original Exeter Bridge started life as a timber footbridge built by the Binghams of Exeter House, in order to access their gardens on the other side of the River Derwent.  Exeter House was eventually demolished because of cost and to allow improvements to the bridge to be made.

The old Exeter Bridge was demolished in 1929 and replaced by a single-span concrete bridge designed by Charles Herbert Aslin of the City Architect's Department, who was also responsible for Derby's now demolished Art Deco-style bus station. During construction a test was carried out to see if it would hold the weight of the traffic. Civil engineers ran a procession of traction engines, steam rollers and heavy lorries across the bridge to check it could take the strain. It was officially opened by the minister of transport, Herbert Morrison on 13 March 1931.

Exeter Bridge features bas relief sculptures of:

John Lombe, founder of the Silk Mill Museum, one of England's first modern factories, now a World Heritage site.
William Hutton, who worked at the Silk Mill as a child before becoming a bookseller and writing the first published history of Derby in 1791.
Herbert Spencer, born in Exeter Street, best known for coining the concept "survival of the fittest", which he did in Principles of Biology (1864), after reading Charles Darwin's On the Origin of Species.
Erasmus Darwin, physician, botanist and poet; Darwin lived in Derby for the last 20 years of his life, dying at Breadsall Priory. Like Hutton he was a radical thinker, supporting the American Revolution.

See also
 List of crossings of the River Derwent, Derbyshire

References

Bridges completed in 1931
Bridges in Derby
Bridges across the River Derwent, Derbyshire